Barcelona Atlético may refer to:

FC Barcelona B, football club in Spain, formerly known as FC Barcelona Atlétic.
Club Barcelona Atlético, football club in the Dominican Republic.